The white-throated seedeater (Sporophila albogularis) is a species of bird in the family Thraupidae.
It is endemic to northeastern Brazil.

Its natural habitats are subtropical or tropical dry forests, subtropical or tropical dry shrubland, and heavily degraded former forest.

References

External links
Associação Mãe-da-lua White-throated Seedeater (Sporophila albogularis) - Photos, sounds, notes

white-throated seedeater
Birds of the Caatinga
Endemic birds of Brazil
white-throated seedeater
Taxonomy articles created by Polbot